Sunyer II (c. 840–915) was the count of Empúries from 862 and Roussillon from 896 until his death.  He was the son of Sunyer I of Empúries.

He and his brother Dela obtained the county of Empúries in 862 after Humfrid, margrave of Gothia, rebelled.  They governed it together until Dela's death.  In 878, the council of Troyes deposed Bernat of Gothia, who had held Roussillon since 865.  It was given to Miro the Elder and, in 896, when Miro died, it passed by heredity to Sunifred.  Together with Dela, he tried to occupy Girona, but their cousin, Wilfred the Hairy, stopped them.  In 888, he travelled to Orléans to do homage to King Odo of France.  In 891, he prepared a naval expedition to attack Moorish Almería.  The campaign, however, ended in a truce.

He married a woman named Ermengarda, with whom he had the following issue:

Bencion (d. 916), successor
Gausbert (d. 931), successor of his brother
Elmerat (d. 920), bishop of Elna
Guadal (d. 947), bishop of Elna

References

|-

840s births
915 deaths
Year of birth uncertain
9th-century people from West Francia
Counts of Empúries
Counts of Roussillon
10th-century Catalan people
9th-century Visigothic people
10th-century Visigothic people